A significant late-season tornado outbreak took place on November 4, 2022, across Northeast Texas, southwestern Arkansas, southeastern Oklahoma, and northwestern Louisiana with multiple large, destructive tornadoes occurring over a span of several hours. Major damage was reported in Sulphur Springs, Powderly, Caviness, Paris, Cason, Daingerfield, Athens, New Boston, Texas, and Idabel, Oklahoma, with the latter two communities being placed under tornado emergencies.  Two fatalities occurred in Cason, Texas, and Pickens, Oklahoma respectively. Numerous PDS tornado warnings were issued as well. An additional tornado embedded within a narrow, but intense line of showers with damaging winds was also confirmed in Illinois the following morning as the system progressed eastward. Strong winds affected most of the western Great Lakes throughout the day before moving into Canada that evening. Two fatalities and at least 34 injuries were confirmed from tornadoes, and an additional fatality occurred near Stilwell, Oklahoma from drowning.

Meteorological synopsis

The risk for a late-season severe weather event first became apparent on October 29 when the Storm Prediction Center (SPC) delineated a threat area across portions of the United States Southern Plains. With some time, computer weather models began to indicate the potential for a significant outbreak of severe thunderstorms farther east across portions of Northeastern Texas, Southeastern Oklahoma, and Southwestern Arkansas. On November 2, the SPC issued a Day 3 slight risk outlook, which had a rare upgrade to enhanced, highlighting a small corridor centered along northeastern Texas, extreme southeastern Oklahoma, southwestern Arkansas, and northwestern Louisiana. Elevated helicity, expected to be around 250 m2/s2, was expected to be coupled with a 50+ kt low-level jet in the area, providing the necessary ingredients for sustained supercells and embedded QLCS rotations, noting the possibilities for tornadoes, some significant. Tornadoes were expected to be most probable with any supercell that managed to spawn ahead of an expected cold front.

The next day, at 0600 UTC, the SPC expanded the enhanced risk area, while introducing a 10% hatched risk for tornadoes (indicating an elevated probability for strong tornadoes to occur), centered in northeastern Texas, and southeastern Oklahoma. With the newer models, more substantial destabilization was expected across the I-35 corridor, giving more favorable patterns for semi-discrete supercell structures to develop. Moisture, provided by sufficient daylight heating, was expected to mix with the predicted low-level jet, at around 500mb, would further improve the conditions for supercells. For the 1700 UTC outlook, the SPC increased the overall area of risk for significant tornadoes, now including regions of southwestern Arkansas.

The SPC issued a level 4/Moderate risk of severe weather for this region on the afternoon of November 4. Water vapor imagery the morning of the event depicted a large upper-level trough moving across New Mexico, with accompanied mid-level winds upwards of  entering Western Texas. At the surface, the expected, stout cold front was progressing southward across Southern Oklahoma. In the warm sector ahead of this feature, southerly low-level winds supplied the northward transport of moisture. Morning atmospheric soundings from the Dallas–Fort Worth metroplex indicated the presence of a stout capping inversion. However, the combination of that rich moisture – with dewpoints in the upper 60s to lower 70s Fahrenheit – and cooling mid-level temperatures were expected to foster modest destabilization of the atmosphere despite widespread cloud cover. Mid-level convective available potential energy values were forecast to reach 1,000–2,000 J/kg.

At 18:00 UTC (1:00 p.m. CDT), the SPC issued the first of several weather watches across the Southern Plains, warning of the potential for a few intense tornadoes across the level 4/Moderate risk area. As the capping inversion eroded, a band of thunderstorms began to develop south of the Dallas–Fort Worth metroplex and progress eastward. Given the favorable confluence of strong wind shear, deep moisture, and instability, this band organized into distinct and significant supercell thunderstorms across the ArkLaTex region. Numerous tornadoes were observed, some of which were large and destructive, notably in the cities of Powderly and New Boston in Texas, and Idabel, Oklahoma; rare tornado emergencies were issued for the latter two cities. While concerns about additional supercell development shifted eastward into Southern Arkansas and Northern Louisiana, forecasters warned of an increasing damaging wind threat across Western and Central Arkansas.

Confirmed tornadoes

November 4 event

November 5 event

Brookston–Midcity–Arthur City, Texas/Sawyer, Oklahoma

The tornado touched down at EF1 strength southwest of Brookston in Lamar County, Texas and moved to the northeast. To the west-northwest of Brookston, it intensified to low-end EF2 strength as it collapsed several metal truss transmission towers. As the tornado crossed US 82, it weakened back to high-end EF1 strength as it snapped some wooden power poles. Shortly after crossing the highway, the tornado produced more high-end EF1 damage as it snapped multiple hardwood trees. EF1 damage to trees and structures continued as the tornado moved through rural areas to the northeast, passing east of Sumner. Next to that residence, two other homes were heavily damaged and had their roofs torn off, and damage to those two houses was rated high-end EF2. Vehicles were flipped and tossed in this area, and large trees were snapped and stripped of their branches. Another house that was farther from the center of the damage path had its roof heavily damaged, with the damage to that home being rated mid-range EF1. In Caviness, the tornado reached its peak strength and crossed County Road 33620, where a well-constructed, anchor-bolted home was completely leveled and swept off its foundation. Next to the EF4 damage, trees were denuded and partially debarked, and two other homes were also leveled and swept away. Additional homes in this area had their roofs and some exterior walls torn off at high-end EF2 strength.

The tornado rapidly weakened back down to EF1 strength and downed many trees as it passed through Camp Maxey. Past Camp Maxey, it rapidly re-intensified again to low-end EF3 strength as it directly impacted the small community of Midcity, where major damage occurred. In Midcity, two homes were destroyed at low-end EF3 strength, sustaining total roof loss and collapse of their exterior walls. Several other homes in town sustained high-end EF2 damage, and numerous trees and power poles were snapped in this area as well. Exiting Midcity and continuing to the northeast, the tornado weakened and narrowed as it crossed US 271, passing east of Arthur City. Structures and trees sustained EF1 damage as it moved towards the Red River and the Oklahoma state line. It then crossed into Choctaw County, Oklahoma and reintensified to EF2 strength, snapping numerous large hardwood trees in a wooded area near the intersection of North 4258 Road and East 2150 Road. An outbuilding was damaged, and many hardwood trees were snapped or uprooted in this unpopulated area. EF1 tree damage continued as it passed east of Sawyer and crossed over US-70 before the tornado dissipated east-southeast of Spencerville. Despite the severity of the damage, no fatalities occurred as a result of this tornado, though 11 people were injured.

Clarksville, Texas/Idabel–Broken Bow–Eagletown, Oklahoma

This long-tracked and violent wedge tornado, the longest-tracked of the outbreak, caused major damage along its path of  through northeast Texas and southeast Oklahoma. The tornado touched down northwest of Bogata in Red River County, Texas, producing EF1 damage as it tore tin metal roofing off a large chicken house. Moving to the northeast, the tornado reached mid-range EF3 strength as it crossed FM 411 to the east of the small community of Fulbright. A house in this area collapsed and was pushed off its foundation, and a nearby home was left with only interior walls standing. A metal outbuilding was also obliterated, with damage to that structure being rated EF2. The tornado then weakened slightly but remained strong as it moved through wooded areas near County Road 1275, inflicting low-end EF3 damage to numerous large softwood and hardwood trees, a few of which sustained debarking. It then weakened to EF2 strength and crossed US 82, snapping and uprooting trees near the highway. EF2 damage continued northwest of Clarksville, and multiple homes and outbuildings were damaged or destroyed along this segment of the path. To the north of Clarksville, a house along SH 37 had much of its roof blown off, trees were snapped, and damage in this area was rated high-end EF1. Just beyond this point, the tornado abruptly intensified, reaching EF4 strength along County Road 3105. Ten people on the property of the home took shelter in an oil drain inside of a nearby metal outbuilding that was completely destroyed, and were left uninjured. Surrounding the EF4-rated home, widespread tree damage occurred, as large trees were snapped and debarked. Some trees were ripped out of the ground, a car was thrown into a field, and outbuildings were destroyed as well.

To the northeast of Clarksville, the tornado weakened again as it moved through remote forested areas, producing a large swath of EF3-level tree damage. It then impacted the rural community of Acworth at high-end EF3 strength, debarking trees and destroying multiple structures. The Mount Olive Church and a house were both completely leveled by the tornado. A double-wide manufactured home in Acworth was lifted off the ground and tossed . The manufactured home had three dogs inside, all three of which survived. After entering Oklahoma, the tornado inflicted mid-range EF2 damage to several single-family homes as it moved through rural areas towards Idabel. A couple of the homes along this segment of the path sustained roof and exterior wall loss, outbuildings were destroyed, and trees were snapped or uprooted. Based on the damage observed in this area, it was determined that this gust was actually from the powerful rear flank downdraft of the supercell rather than the tornado itself.

The tornado narrowed and re-intensified again as it moved into Idabel, producing EF3 damage and injuring several people as it impacted the town. Major structural damage occurred in southeastern Idabel, as homes had their roofs torn off, some sustained collapse of their exterior walls, and one home along Leesa Drive was left with only a few walls standing. A two-story home had much of its second floor torn off and destroyed, and some businesses were damaged in this area as well. At the Idabel Country Club, numerous trees were snapped at EF2 strength, while one grove of hardwood trees at this location were snapped, stripped of their branches, and sustained debarking, earning a low-end EF3 rating. Multiple homes at the Idabel Country Club were damaged by a combination of tornadic winds and falling trees. The nearby Kiamichi Family Medical Center had severe structural damage, sustaining roof and exterior wall loss, with metal beams twisted and façade torn off. Insulation from the building was strewn throughout the area, and damage to the structure was rated EF2. Continuing through eastern Idabel at EF3 strength, the tornado then crossed Southeast Lincoln Road, where it completely leveled the Donut Crossing donut shop and a nearby tire shop. Concrete anchors were pulled out of the ground at this location, and a nearby doctor's office and a local bank were completely destroyed as well. Debris was scattered throughout this area, a McDonald's sign was damaged, and a few other businesses were damaged to a lesser degree.

This narrow path of EF2 damage was likely caused by sub-vortices moving around within the larger circulation of the tornado. Trees were damaged, and a house at Meadow Lane had a large portion of its roof ripped off. Past Idabel, the tornado maintained its strength as it moved through unpopulated wooded areas, downing numerous trees and destroying some chicken houses. A small break in the damage path was noted as the tornado briefly lifted near the Little River with the rotation remaining aloft, though it quickly touched down again and reached high-end EF2 strength as it continued to the northeast, passing between Broken Bow and Eagletown. Significant damage was observed at the intersection of Craig Road and Red Arrow Road, where a double-wide mobile home was completely destroyed, with its metal undercarriage separated from the floor and bent. An elevator structure was blown off the top of a large silo, while many trees and power poles were snapped at this location as well. Farther along the path, mid-range EF2 damage occurred as the tornado crossed US-70, snapping additional power poles and downing numerous trees. The tornado then began to weaken significantly after it crossed US-70 and passed north of Eagletown, snapping and knocking down small trees at EF0 strength before dissipating after crossing Old Winship Road. 13 people were injured by this tornado.

Cason–Naples, Texas
 
This intense wedge tornado touched down in Morris County, Texas to the south of Cason along FM 144, and rapidly intensified to low-end EF2 strength almost immediately after it formed. Two manufactured homes were destroyed, two frame homes were damaged to a lesser degree, a boat was tossed, a small trailer was flipped, and trees were uprooted. Continuing to the northeast, the tornado continued to produce EF2 damage as it crossed County Road 1202, where another manufactured home was destroyed, and debris from the structure was scattered into a wooded area. A small outbuilding was also destroyed, and many trees were snapped. Just past this area, it quickly reached its peak strength of mid-range EF3 at County Road 1203, where a house was completely swept away and debris from the residence was scattered into a field. Another house in this area was unroofed and sustained some loss of exterior walls, and damage to that home was rated EF2. The tornado then weakened to EF1 strength as it approached and then crossed over SH 11, where an RV was overturned, a frail home suffered extensive damage, and trees were downed. Additional EF1 damage to trees and an outbuilding occurred farther to the northeast. As the tornado began crossing SH 49 northwest of Daingerfield, it intensified to mid-range EF2 strength as it snapped power poles and completely destroyed two poorly-constructed pier-foundation homes, both of which were leveled and swept away. Trees in this area were snapped and denuded, several of which sustained some debarking.

As the tornado continued to the northeast, it weakened slightly to high-end EF2 strength as it crossed County Road 3201, where an anchored mobile home was completely destroyed, killing one occupant. Hardwood trees were snapped next to this residence, and another mobile home was also destroyed at mid-range EF2 strength nearby. The tornado then weakened and produced mainly EF1 damage as it approached and crossed US 259, though a small pocket of EF2 damage was noted near County Road 3207, where a couple of metal truss electrical transmission towers were blown over. Numerous trees were downed, a mobile home was pushed off its foundation, and other homes and outbuildings sustained minor damage along this segment of the path. After it crossed over US 259, a final area of significant damage occurred just to the east of the Greater Morris County Airport, as multiple large trees were snapped at low-end EF2 strength along SH 338. A one-story home and a metal garage structure within the vicinity sustained EF1 damage. The tornado then caused additional EF0 to EF1 tree damage as it passed southeast of Naples and moved into Cass County. More EF0 to EF1 tree damage was observed to the east of Naples before the tornado dissipated immediately after moving across SH 77. In addition to the fatality, eight other people were injured. The supercell produced another EF3 tornado shortly after this one dissipated.

Simms–New Boston, Texas

Shortly after the dissipation of the Cason–Naples, Texas EF3 tornado listed above, the same supercell produced another strong wedge tornado southwest of Simms that inflicted significant damage along a  path. As the tornado touched down along US 67 and tracked northeastward, it snapped numerous trees and tree branches. An outbuilding was damaged, a power pole was snapped, and damage along this initial segment of the path was rated EF0 to EF1. About  to the northeast, the tornado intensified into a low-end EF2 as it crossed County Road 4213 to the west of Simms. Around this area, multiple trees and wooden power poles were snapped, a small outbuilding was completely destroyed, while an RV trailer and a metal storage container were rolled . A couple of homes suffered roof and window damage as well. While tracking northeastward, the tornado crossed County Road 4121 and intensified to mid-range EF2 strength, completely destroying a double-wide manufactured home. A small outbuilding was destroyed nearby, and damage to that structure was rated low-end EF2. The tornado intensified further and continued moving to the northeast, causing low-end EF3 damage at the intersection of FM 561 and County Road 4120 to the north-northwest of Simms. A one-story home sustained total roof loss and collapse of exterior walls, and a small section of asphalt was scoured from FM 561 and thrown into the house. Widespread EF2 damage occurred surrounding this smaller area of EF3 damage, as a well-built brick home had its roof torn off, another house was partially unroofed, while a horse stable and a metal outbuilding were destroyed. A double-wide manufactured home in this area was shifted off its foundation by several feet, and a tree falling on the home saved it from being blown away, leaving the occupants without serious injuries. As the tornado continued northeast of the intersection, it destroyed another outbuilding at low-end EF2 strength before weakening considerably.

Following SH 98 to the north-northeast, the tornado produced EF0 to EF1 tree damage near the Barry Telford Unit. The tornado inflicted mainly EF2 damage elsewhere at the intersection as a gun shop and some homes were unroofed, one house was shifted off its foundation and left with only interior walls standing, some metal buildings were heavily damaged, while outbuildings and large garages were completely destroyed. A church and some other houses had partial roof loss within this vicinity as well, and a mobile home was pushed off its blocks and heavily damaged. The tornado weakened down to EF1 strength as it moved to the northeast, causing widespread tree damage and damaging a couple of houses, one of which suffered extensive damage to its roof structure. Around County Road 4001 and Deerfield Lane, the tornado became strong again and inflicted mid-range EF2 damage to a house, which had much of its roof removed and sustained some collapse of exterior walls. It then weakened to an EF1 again and clipped the western outskirts of New Boston, crossing US 82 and I-30 in the process. A few homes in this area sustained considerable roof damage, and many trees were snapped or uprooted. North of I-30, the tornado briefly became strong one final time as it completely destroyed a shop building at mid-range EF2 strength while inflicting EF1 damage to a nearby home. The tornado quickly weakened back to EF1 strength and continued a little further northeast near New Boston Middle School, crossing County Road 3009 and snapping some trees before dissipating. The tornado maintained a large width for the majority of its lifespan, with its peak width reaching . No serious injuries or fatalities occurred as a result of this tornado.

Non-tornadic effects 
The same storm that produced the tornadoes also produced a winter storm on the backend. In Denver, a 100-car pileup relating to the first snow of the season forced 6th Avenue to close. The crash led to 13 injuries, one of which was serious. Near Stilwell, Oklahoma, flooding resulted in a fatality from drowning after a person was swept off a road. Heavy rain in Kansas City accumulated to at least , with  falling on November 4 alone, making it the 5th wettest November day on record in the city. Further east, in Wisconsin, hail of up to  fell, while in Illinois a strongly forced line of showers along the cold front produced wind gusts reaching .

Impact
Over 600 flights were cancelled. 55,000 customers lost power in Texas, in addition to 21,000 outages in Louisiana and 12,000 outages in Arkansas. Amtrak's northbound Texas Eagle was forced to stop north of McGregor, Texas due to severe warnings along its route on November 4. The train was delayed for four hours before it was allowed to continue northward. An Oklahoma Mesonet station near Idabel was narrowly missed by the EF4 tornado that passed through the town, while detecting a drop in pressure that directly coincided with a  wind gust.

See also 

 Weather of 2022
 List of North American tornadoes and tornado outbreaks
 List of F4 and EF4 tornadoes (2020–present)

Notes

References

2022 meteorology
2022 natural disasters
Tornadoes of 2022
F4 tornadoes